Surround is the second album from Jon Bauer.

Credits

Track listing
 "Awaken" (Jon Bauer) - 3:26
 "Call to Me" (Jon Bauer & Jeff Watt) - 4:27
 "Surround" (Jon Bauer) - 4:09
 "Holy Lord" (Jon Bauer) - 4:48
 "Giver of Grace" (Jon Bauer & Jeff Watt) - 3:49
 "A Love to Die For" (Jon Bauer & Jeff Watt) - 5:05
 "Glorious to Me" (Jon Bauer & Jeff Watt) - 3:45
 "You Are" (Jon Bauer) - 3:24
 "It Was Your Love" (Jon Bauer & Glenn Freckelton) - 3:47
 "Holy Holy Holy (You Are Holy Lord)" (John Bacchus Dykes & Reginald Heber, arranged by Jon Bauer) - 5:58

References 

Jon Bauer albums
2007 albums